The Wilcox train robbery also known as the Wilcox Holdup was a train robbery that took place in the early morning of June 2, 1899 in the vicinity of Wilcox, Wyoming. A Union Pacific train was flagged down before it could cross a wooden bridge. Armed men forced the train crew to separate the locomotive from the carriages. Once the unattached locomotive had been driven across the bridge, the bridge was destroyed with dynamite. A safe in one of the carriages was blown open by dynamite, and the robbers escaped with cash and other valuables. The robbery although considered unsolved at the time was later traced to Butch Cassidy and the Wild Bunch.

References

1899 crimes in the United States
Train robberies
Robberies in the United States
Crimes in Wyoming
1899 in Wyoming
June 1899 events